Giorgio Dell'Agostino (born 4 February 1995) is an Italian male canoeist who won three medals at senior level at the Wildwater Canoeing World Championships.

Medals at the World Championships
Senior

References

External links
 

1995 births
Living people
Italian male canoeists
21st-century Italian people